Esmeralda was a wooden-hulled steam corvette of the Chilean Navy, launched in 1855, and sunk by the  on 21 May 1879 at the Battle of Iquique during the War of the Pacific.

Ship history

Construction
Construction of the ship was authorized on 30 June 1852 by President Manuel Montt and the Minister of War and Navy José Francisco Gana. Chilean naval officer Roberto Simpson Winthrop and shipbuilder William Pitcher of Northfleet, England, signed a contract for her construction, at a total cost of £23,000, on 23 October 1854.

The ship was laid down in December 1854, and launched on 26 June 1855 under the name Esmeralda, after the frigate captured by Thomas Cochrane during the Chilean War of Independence.

Her hull was of wood, and coppered. The single propeller could be decoupled and raised when under sail. The ship's complement was 200.

Service history
Esmeralda was commissioned into the Chilean Navy on 18 September 1855, and eventually sailed from Falmouth, Cornwall, under Simpson's command and arrived at Valparaíso on 7 November 1856.

Her original armament of twenty 32-pounder guns was replaced in 1867–68 with twelve Armstrong rifled 40-pounders and four Whitworth smoothbore 40-pounders.

On 24 May 1875, Esmeralda was driven ashore and severely damaged in a gale at Valparaíso. In 1877 she sailed to Easter Island and Tahiti on a training voyage.

Despite the material superiority of the Peruvian ship, the battle lasted for over three hours. The captain of Esmeralda, Arturo Prat, was killed while leading an attempt to board the enemy vessel, and Huáscar eventually sank Esmeralda after repeated ramming.

Museum Corbeta Esmeralda
In Iquique, a replica of Esmeralda as she was on 20 May 1879 was opened as a museum ship on 20 May 2011 by President Sebastián Piñera, including the descendants of Arturo Prat.

The museum corresponds on the representation of 1:1 scale of the major departments in Esmeralda.

References

Bibliography

External links
 

1855 ships
Ships built in Northfleet
Steam corvettes of the Chilean Navy
Maritime incidents in May 1875
Maritime incidents in May 1879
Shipwrecks of the War of the Pacific
Shipwrecks of Chile